Raposos is a Brazilian municipality located in the state of Minas Gerais. The city belongs to the mesoregion Metropolitana de Belo Horizonte and to the microregion of Belo Horizonte.

Geography

The municipality contains the Raposos gold mines opened by the Saint John d'El Rey Mining Company around 1910.
At the end of 1955 the Raposos mines had total reserves of 1,694,080 metric tons of ore with an average of 9.5 grams of gold per ton.

The municipality contains about 10% of the  Serra do Gandarela National Park, created in 2014.

See also
 List of municipalities in Minas Gerais

References

Sources

Municipalities in Minas Gerais